Royal Hakvoort Shipyards is a shipbuilding company specialized in building large luxury motor yachts. It is located in the municipality of Monnickendam in the Netherlands.

History

The shipyard was established in 1919 by Albert Hakvoort Sr. when he purchased ground, a warehouse and shipbuilding equipment in the town of Monnickendam. In 1944 his son Klaas Sr. joined the company. First building wooden vessels they switched to steel after World War II. To aid growth a new slipway was built for the repair and construction of ever larger vessels.

In 1955 they ran into financial trouble after a fire destroyed two sheds and multiple adjacent houses. The financial trouble was caused because the yard was not insured for religious reasons. Albert Sr.'s other son, Albert Jr., left school to help rebuild the yard over the next few years. The family's determination paid off with 70 fishing trawlers being built between 1959 and 1980.

Under the direction of the third generation, Klaas Sr.'s sons Albert and Klaas Jr., the focus shifted from commercial fishing vessels to sport fishing yachts. Klaas Sr. stepped back in 1981 and his sons took over the family business. The first large yacht the yard build was the  MY Tonga.

In 1993 Albert bought his brothers share of the company. This was in a period the yard was collaborating with another Dutch shipyard, Oceanco. Also in this period Albert's sons, Klaas and Albert Jr., joined the shipyard in 1991 & 1993, marking the entry of the fourth generation. A new carpentry department opened its doors 1999 in the neighboring town of Purmerend.

Some orders were cancelled due to the financial crisis of 2007–2008. However, their order book collapsed after international sanctions against Russia in 2014.

On November 13, 2020, Hakvoort received one of the most prestigious honors for a Dutch company: the Royal designation. From then on the yard can use the Royal title and put a stylised crown above their logo.

List of yachts built

See also
Feadship - another Dutch shipyard with a royal charter
Royal Huisman - another Dutch shipyard with a royal charter
Royal IHC - another Dutch shipyard with a royal charter

References

Vehicle manufacturing companies established in 1919
1919 establishments in the Netherlands
Dutch brands
Yacht building companies
Sailing in the Netherlands
Shipbuilding companies of the Netherlands
Companies based in North Holland
Monnickendam
Lists of yachts